Robinson Ekspeditionen 2015 is the seventeenth season of the Danish reality television series Robinson Ekspeditionen. This season like the last consists of couples competing against each other in Caramoan, Philippines, to try to win 500,000 kr. for themselves while also trying to survive nature and their loved ones. The season premiered on 31 August 2015 and concluded on 23 November 2015 when Kenneth Mikkelsen won in the final challenge against Nicole Bech Hansen and Camilla Holm to win the grand prize and be crowned that year's Robinson winner.

Finishing order

References

External links

Robinson Ekspeditionen seasons
2015 Danish television seasons